Stiliana Nikolova (born 22 August 2005 in Cairo, Egypt) is a Bulgarian individual rhythmic gymnast.  She is the 2022 World all-around bronze medalist and hoop, clubs, and ribbon silver medalist, as well as the 2022 European Championships all-around bronze medalist and team champion. She is also the 2020 European Junior ribbon champion and ball silver medalist.

At the national level, she is the 2022 Bulgarian National all-around silver medalist, and the 2019 and 2020 Bulgarian National Junior all-around champion.

Personal life
Stiliana is born 22 August 2005 in Cairo, Egypt. Her father, Iliya Dyakov was a football player who represented Bulgaria at the 1986 Football World Cup in Mexico. Her mother, Paulina Nikolova, was a group rhythmic gymnast, competing for Bulgaria and is the 1985 World Group All-Around champion. Stiliana has one sister, Paola, and a brother, Denis. Since a very young age Stiliana spent all her time in training hall together with her mother and older sister, who both work as Rhythmic Gymnastic coaches in Egypt. She moved alone to Bulgaria in 2018 at age go 13 to join the Bulgarian national team of Rhythmic Gymnastics.

Career

Junior
She competed at the 2019 Bulgarian Junior National Championships where she won the gold medal in the All-around, Ball and Ribbon final, and the silver medal in Rope and Clubs final. She competed at the 2019 Junior World Championships in Moscow, Russia where she placed 8th in Team competition and 16th in Clubs qualifications.

In 2020, she became Bulgarian Junior National All-Around champion once again, won the gold medal with Ball, Clubs and Ribbon, and the bronze medal with Rope. She competed at the International Tournament in Moscow, where she and her teammate Eva Brezalieva took 2nd place in the Team competition. She also won the gold medal in All-around at the International Tournament Corbeil-Essonnes in France. In the finals, she placed 1st with Rope and Ball and 3rd with Ribbon. She competed at the 2020 Junior European Championships in Kyiv, Ukraine and qualified for two apparatus finals. She won the gold medal with Ribbon and the silver medal with Ball.

Senior
In the 2022 season, she participated at the 2022 Grand Prix Marbella, where is placed 3rd All-Around. She qualified for three apparatus finals, winning gold in hoop and clubs and taking the silver in the ball final. On April 8-10, she competed at Sofia World Cup, where she placed third in All-around. She also won gold in clubs and silver in the ribbon final. In May, Nikolova participated at the 2022 World Challenge Cup in Pamplona where she won silver in the All-round behind teammate Boryana Kaleyn. She also won the gold in the clubs final and got silver in ball. On June 3–5, she competed at the Pesaro World Cup, where she finished 3rd All-around, and qualified for three apparatus finals, winning bronze medals with clubs and ball, and silver in hoop. From June 15–19, Nikolova competed at the 2022 European Championships in Tel Aviv, Israel where she won one gold medals and one bronze medals in team and all-around final respectively. On August 26-28, she competed at the 2022 World Challenge Cup Cluj-Napoca where she won the silver in all-around. She also won 2 medals in the apparatus final, gold in clubs and bronze in hoop final. She was then selected to compete at the 2022 Rhythmic Gymnastics World Championships, in Sofia, Bulgaria, along with teammate Boryana Kaleyn. She qualified to the individual all-round final and three apparatus finals, in which she won one bronze in all-around and three silver medals in hoop, clubs and ribbon. She also won an Olympic quota for Bulgaria.

Her first competition in the 2023 season was Grand Prix Miss Valentine in Tartu, Estonia, where is finished second in the all-around and qualified to ball, clubs and ribbon final. She won both ball and clubs final.  Afterwards she competed at the 2023 Grand Prix Marbella, where is won silver in All-Around. She qualified for all apparatus finals, winning gold in ball and clubs and bronze in hoop and ribbon finals. She also took part  in  Athens World Cup, where she won silver in all-around, gold in ball and bronze in the ribbon final.

Routine music information

Competitive highlights
(Team competitions in seniors are held only at the World Championships, Europeans and other Continental Games.)

{| border=1 cellpadding=1 cellspacing=2 style="border-collapse: collapse; text-align:center; font-size: 80%;"
|-
! align=center colspan=8  style="background-color: #D6D6FF; "| International: Senior
|-
! align=center|Year
! align=center|Event
! width=100px|AA
! width=100px|Team
! width=100px|Hoop
! width=100px|Ball
! width=100px|Clubs
! width=100px|Ribbon 
|-

|-

| rowspan="3" |2023
|align=left|World Cup Athens||bgcolor=silver|2nd|||||| ||9th (Q)||
|-
|align=left|Grand Prix RG Marbella 2023||bgcolor=silver|2nd||||bgcolor=CC9966|3rd||bgcolor=gold|1st||bgcolor=gold|1st||bgcolor=CC9966|3rd
|-
|-
|align=left|Grand Prix RG Tartu 2023||bgcolor=silver|2nd||||9th (Q)||bgcolor=gold|1st||bgcolor=gold|1st||bgcolor=CC9966|3rd
|-

|-
| rowspan="6" |2022
|align=left|World Championships Sofia||bgcolor=CC9966|3rd||||bgcolor=silver|2nd||11th (Q)||bgcolor=silver|2nd||bgcolor=silver|2nd
|-
| align="left"| World Challenge Cup Cluj-Napoca||bgcolor=silver|2nd||||bgcolor=CC9966|3rd||5th||bgcolor=gold|1st||8th
|-
|align=left|European Championships Tel Aviv||bgcolor=CC9966|3rd||bgcolor=gold|1st||8th||4th||5th||4th
|-
|align=left|World Cup Pesaro||bgcolor=CC9966|3rd||||bgcolor=silver|2nd||bgcolor=CC9966|3rd||3rd||14th(Q)
|-
|align=left|World Challenge Cup Pamplona||bgcolor=silver|2nd||||8th||bgcolor=silver|2nd||bgcolor=gold|1st||4th
|-
|align=left|World Cup Sofia||bgcolor=CC9966|3rd||||8th||11th (Q)||bgcolor=gold|1st||bgcolor=silver|2nd
|-
| rowspan="2" |2021
| align="left"| World Challenge Cup Minsk||10th||||10th (Q)||9th (Q)||10th (Q)||10th (Q)
|-
| align="left"| World Cup Pesaro||9th||||10th (Q)||16th (Q)||8th||12th (Q)
|-
! align=center colspan=8  style="background-color: #D6D6FF; "| International: Junior
|-
! align=center|Year
! align=center|Event
! width=100px|AA
! width=100px|Team
! width=100px|Rope
! width=100px|Ball
! width=100px|Clubs
! width=100px|Ribbon
|-
|rowspan="1" width=50px|2020||align=left | Junior European Championships ||||||6th (Q)||bgcolor=silver|2nd||16th (Q)||bgcolor=gold|1st
|-
|rowspan="1" width=50px|2019||align=left|Junior World Championships||||8th||||||16th (Q)||
|-

References

External links 
 

Living people
2005 births
Sportspeople from Cairo
Bulgarian rhythmic gymnasts
Medalists at the Rhythmic Gymnastics World Championships